Mog was a British television comedy from 1985 and 1986 about a cat burglar living in a psychiatric hospital. It starred Enn Reitel as the title character, who is only faking insanity. It was based on Peter Tinniswood's 1970 novel of the same name.  It was made for the ITV network by Witzend for Central.

External links
.

ITV sitcoms
1980s British sitcoms
1985 British television series debuts
1986 British television series endings
Television series by ITV Studios
Television shows produced by Central Independent Television
English-language television shows